General elections were held in the Turks and Caicos Islands on 19 February 2021 to elect members of the House of Assembly. The result was a landslide victory for the Progressive National Party, which won 14 of the 15 seats in the House.

Electoral system
At the time of the election, the House of Assembly has 21 members : 15 elected members, four appointed members and two ex officio members. 

The 15 elected members were elected by two methods; ten were elected from single-member constituencies, with five elected on an at-large basis, with voters able to vote for up to five candidates at the national level. 

The four appointed members include one nominated by the Premier, one nominated by the Leader of the Opposition and two members appointed by the Governor. In addition, the Attorney General and the Speaker are ex officio members.

Results

By constituency

References

Turks
General
Elections in the Turks and Caicos Islands
Turks